Ellen Mirojnick is an American costume designer. She is a frequent collaborator of actor Michael Douglas, having overseen the costume design for the films Fatal Attraction (1987), Wall Street (1987), Basic Instinct (1992), A Perfect Murder (1998), Wall Street: Money Never Sleeps (2010) and Behind the Candelabra (2013). The wardrobe which she created for the character of Gordon Gekko inspired a fashion trend in the late 1980s and early 1990s for boldly patterned ties, sleek suits, crisp white shirts, and colorful suspenders in men's business wear. She has also been a frequent collaborator of directors Jan de Bont and Paul Verhoeven, acting as costume designer on de Bont's films Speed (1994), Twister (1996) and The Haunting (1999), as well as Verhoeven's films Basic Instinct (1992), Showgirls (1995), Starship Troopers (1997) and Hollow Man (2000).

She won an Emmy and a Costume Designers Guild Award in 2013 for her work on the Liberace biopic Behind the Candelabra.  In 2016 she was given the Career Achievement Award by the Costume Designers Guild. In 2017 she gained further praise for her work on The Greatest Showman, which garnered her a further nomination for Excellence in Period Film with the Costume Designers Guild.

Sharon Stone has praised her experience with Mirojnick on Basic Instinct:

Film 

 Fatal Attraction (1987)
 Wall Street (1987)
 Black Rain (1989)
 Jacob's Ladder (1990)
 Basic Instinct (1992)
 Chaplin (1992)
 Cliffhanger (1993)
 Speed (1994)
 Showgirls (1995)
 Twister (1996)
 Face/Off (1997)
 Starship Troopers (1997)
 The Haunting (1999)
 Hollow Man (2000)
 What Women Want (2000)
 America's Sweethearts (2001)
 Unfaithful (2002)
 The Chronicles of Riddick (2004)
 Déjà Vu (2006)
 Cloverfield (2008)
 G-Force (2009)
 G.I. Joe: The Rise of Cobra (2009)
 Wall Street: Money Never Sleeps (2010)
 Need for Speed (2014)
 By the Sea (2015)
 Logan Lucky (2017)
First They Killed My Father (2017)
 The Greatest Showman (2017)
 The Girl in the Spider's Web (2018)
 Maleficent: Mistress of Evil (2019)
 Let Them All Talk (2020)
 Cinderella (2021)
 KIMI (2022)
 Oppenheimer (2023)

Television 

 Fame (1982) - 1 episode
 The Wonderful World of Disney (1997) - 1 episode (Rodgers and Hammerstein's Cinderella)
 Person of Interest (2011) - 1 episode
 The Knick (2014 - 2017) - 20 episodes
 Bridgerton (2020) - 8 episodes

References

American costume designers
Emmy Award winners
1949 births
Living people